Gašper Černe (born 24 February 2004) is a Slovenian footballer who plays as a forward for Dob, on loan from Domžale.

Career statistics

Club

References

External links
Gašper Černe at NZS 

2004 births
Living people
Slovenian footballers
Slovenia youth international footballers
Association football forwards
Slovenian PrvaLiga players
Slovenian Second League players
NK Domžale players
NK Dob players